N-Methylhydroxylamine or methylhydroxylamine is a hydroxylamine derivative with a methyl group replacing one of the hydrogens of the amino group. It is an isomer of methoxyamine and aminomethanol. It decomposes in an exothermic reaction (-63 kJ/mol) into methane and azanone unless stored as a hydrochloride salt.

The compound is commercially available as its hydrochloride salt. This can be produced by electrochemical reduction of nitromethane in hydrochloric acid using a copper anode and a graphite cathode.

See also
 Methoxyamine

References

External links
 Sigma-Aldrich N-methylhydroxylamine hydrochloride

Hydroxylamines